Ragasiyamai is a 2003 Tamil-language romance film directed by Amudhan. The film stars Prasanna and Neelan, while Karunas and Ilavarasu played supporting roles.

Cast
Prasanna as Amudhan
Neelam Singh as Vijayalakshmi
Karunas as Sura Karuppan
Ilavarasu
M. S. Bhaskar
S. N. Lakshmi
Pyramid Natarajan as Sundara Pandian

Production
The film has Prasanna, in his second film, and newcomer Neelam Singh in the lead roles. The film was extensively shot in Gujarat and was set in the backdrop of the 2001 Gujarat earthquake. The team shot in the earthquake devastated village of Adhoi in Gujarat and became the first crew in fifty years to go there for a film shooting. A stage came where the crew had to seek police help to continue shooting due to crowd trouble.

Release
A critic noted that "A good performance by Prasanna is the highlight of the film. As for his female lead Neelam, there is a long way to go. The stale storyline has nothing to offer".

Soundtrack

The soundtrack of the film was composed by Karthik Raja.

References

2003 films
Films shot in Gujarat
2000s Tamil-language films
Indian romantic drama films
Films scored by Karthik Raja
2003 directorial debut films
2003 romantic drama films